

Ugo de Carolis (born 1887-12 December 1941) was an Italian  Brigadier-General and commander of the 52 Motorised Division Torino on the eastern front during World War II. He was a recipient of the Knight's Cross of the Iron Cross.

Awards
 Medaglia d'oro al valor militare
 Knight's Cross of the Iron Cross on 9 February 1942 as Generale di brigada and commander of the Italian 52 Motorised Division Torino

See also
 Italian Expeditionary Corps in Russia

References

Citations

Bibliography

 

1887 births
1941 deaths
Recipients of the Gold Medal of Military Valor
Recipients of the Knight's Cross of the Iron Cross
Italian military personnel killed in World War II
Italian generals
People from Capua